The Occupational English Test (also known as OET) is an English language test for healthcare professionals recognised by various regulatory healthcare bodies. It assesses the language communication skills of healthcare professionals who wish to register and practise in an English-speaking environment.

OET is available for the following 12 professions: dentistry, dietetics, medicine, nursing, occupational therapy, optometry, pharmacy, physiotherapy, podiatry, radiography, speech pathology, and veterinary science. Test takers include: nurses (47%), doctors (23%), dentists (20%), and pharmacists (6%).

History

OET was designed in the late 1980s by Professor Tim McNamara, under the guidance of the Australian National Office for Overseas Skills Recognition (NOOSR), which administered the test at that time. The test has been researched and developed continuously since then to ensure that it has kept up with current theory and practice in language assessment. This work has been done by the University of Melbourne's Language Testing Research Centre and by Cambridge Assessment English.

Since March 2013 the test has been owned by Cambridge Boxhill Language Assessment Trust (CBLA), a venture between Cambridge Assessment English and Box Hill Institute.

Recognition
OET is recognised by regulatory healthcare boards and councils in Australia, New Zealand, United Kingdom, United States,Ireland, Dubai, Singapore, Namibia and Ukraine. Many organisations, including hospitals, universities and colleges, are using OET as proof of a candidate's ability to communicate effectively in a demanding healthcare environment. In addition, OET is recognised by the Australian Department of Home Affairs and Immigration New Zealand for all visa categories where an English test may be required.

Each recognising organisation determines which grade results mean that candidates meet the language competency standards to function in their profession.

Modes Exam Delivery 
OET is available in three different delivery modes. OET on Paper at a Test Venue, OET on Computer at a Test Venue and OET at Home. The test tasks, format and level of difficulty remain the same for all the OET tests regardless of the mode of exam delivery.

OET on Paper at a Test Venue 
The OET paper test is the exam delivery mode for OET students for over 30 years. OET tests, in general, has 4 components (Reading, Writing, Speaking, Listening).

OET on Computer at a Test Venue 
OET test on the Computer (at test venues) has the same exam format. The test will be evaluated by the highly-trained examiners who mark paper-based OET.

OET@Home 
OET@Home is for candidates to attend the exam from their own home. OET@Home has the same format, timing and difficulty as a test in the OET test venue. A reliable desktop/laptop with a good internet connection is the basic requirement.

OET Exam Pattern 
OET provides a valid and reliable assessment of all four language skills – Listening, Reading, Writing and Speaking – with an emphasis on communication in medical and health professional settings.

OET comprises four sub-tests:

 Listening (approximately 45 minutes)
 Reading (60 minutes)
 Writing (45 minutes)
 Speaking (approximately 20 minutes).

Listening 
Candidates are required to demonstrate that they can follow and understand a range of health-related spoken materials such as patient consultations and lectures.

Part A - consultation extracts (about 5 minutes each) 
Part A assesses candidates' ability to identify specific information during a consultation. They are required to listen to two recorded health professional-patient consultations and complete the health professional's notes using the information they hear.

Part B – short workplace extracts (about 1 minute each) 
Part B tests candidates' ability to identify the detail, gist, opinion or purpose of short extracts from the healthcare workplace. They are required to listen to six recorded extracts (e.g. team briefings, handovers, or health professional-patient dialogues) and answer one multiple-choice question for each extract.

Part C – presentation extracts (about 5 minutes each) 
Part C assesses candidates' ability to follow a recorded presentation or interview on a range of accessible healthcare topics. They are required to listen to two different extracts and  answer six multiple-choice questions for each extract.

Reading 
Candidates are required to demonstrate that they can read and understand different types of text on health-related subjects.

Part A – expeditious reading task (15 minutes) 
Part A assesses candidates' ability to locate specific information from four short texts in a quick and efficient manner. The four short texts relate to a single healthcare topic, and they must answer 20 questions in the allocated time period. The 20 questions consist of matching, sentence completion and short answer questions.

Part B and Part C – careful reading tasks (45 minutes) 
Part B assesses candidates' ability to identify the detail, gist or main point of six short texts sourced from the healthcare workplace (100-150 words each). The texts might consist of extracts from policy documents, hospital guidelines, manuals or internal communications, such as emails or memos. For each text, there is one three-option multiple-choice question.

Part C assesses candidates' ability to identify detailed meaning and opinion in two texts on topics of interest to healthcare professionals (800 words each). For each text, candidates must answer eight four-option multiple choice questions.

Writing 
The task is to write a letter, usually a referral letter. Sometimes, especially for some professions, a different type of letter is required: e.g. a letter of transfer or discharge, or a letter to advise or inform a patient, carer, or group.

Speaking 
The Speaking sub-test is delivered individually and the candidate takes part in two role-plays. In each role-play, the candidate takes his or her professional role (for example, as a nurse or as a pharmacist) while the interlocutor plays a patient, a client, or a patient's relative or carer. For veterinary science, the interlocutor is the owner or carer of the animal.

Scoring
For each of the four sub-tests that make up OET, candidates receive a numerical score from 0-500 in 10-point increments  e.g. 350,360, 370. The numeric score is mapped to a separate letter grade, ranging from A (highest) to E (lowest). There is no overall grade for OET.

Timing and results
OET is available 14 times per year and can be taken at test venues around the world.

Results are published online approximately 16 business days after the test. Official statements of results are sent out in the post following the release of online results. There is no overall grade – candidates receive separate grades for each sub-test.

Most recognising organisations require candidates to have at least a B grade in each of the four sub-tests and recognise results as valid for up to two years. Most recognising organisations also require that candidates achieve the requisite grades for each sub-test in one sitting. However, candidates should check with the organisation that regulates their profession to confirm current requirements.

Inquiry into Registration Processes and Support for Overseas Trained Doctors
Prior to the formation of the Cambridge Boxhill Language Assessment Trust (CBLA), OET took part in the Inquiry into Registration Processes and Support for Overseas Trained Doctors led by the Australian Government's House Standing Committee on Health and Ageing.

On 23 November 2010, the then Minister for Health and Ageing, Hon Nicola Roxon MP, asked the Committee to inquire and report on the Registration Processes and Support for Overseas Trained Doctors. Persons and organisations of interest were then invited to make submission and asked to address the terms of reference by 4 February 2011.

The terms of references firstly explored the current administrative processes and accountability measures, with the aim of helping Overseas Trained Doctors (OTD) better understand the college assessment process as well as clarifying appeal mechanisms and facilitating community understanding and acceptance of registration decisions.

Secondly, the committee was to report on the support programs available via both state and territory and commonwealth governments, professional organisations and colleges that help OTDs achieve registration requirements and provide suggestions for their enhancement. 
 
Finally, it was mandated to suggest ways to remove impediments and promote pathways for OTDs to achieve a full qualification while ensuring the integrity of the standards set by the colleges and regulatory bodies.

The Lost in the Labyrinth: overseas trained doctors report was finalised on 19 March 2012. It was based on the 14-month inquiry that heard from 146 witnesses from around Australia.

While there two instances of OTDs taking OET and other tests multiple times, the majority of grievances were directed at the regulatory system and the institutions that set the overall requirements. Issues such as the two-year validity of test results, levels of English required to register and achieving required scores in one sitting, are all the prerogative of the medical regulators and are not set by OET or other English test operators. 

The inquiry led to some changes to the registration and compliance system that manages OTDs, including the ability to use two test results within a one six-month period for registration.

Research
OET is underpinned by over 30 years of research and the test is regularly updated to keep pace with changes in language testing in a healthcare context. There is strong emphasis on the ongoing validity and reliability of the test.  Leading language testing academics contribute to the continued development of the test, and subject matter experts are consulted to ensure that tasks are based on a typical workplace situations and the demands of the profession. A full list of research can be seen on the official website

References

External links
 Official website

University of Cambridge examinations
Standardized tests for English language
Standardized tests in healthcare education